Dhikra Mahfoudh (born 23 May 1992) is a Tunisian footballer who plays as a right back for Sbeiba Women's Association and the Tunisia women's national team.

Club career
Mahfoudh has played for Sbeiba Women's Association in Tunisia.

International career
Mahfoudh has capped for Tunisia at senior level, including in a 2–1 friendly away win over Jordan on 10 June 2021.

See also
List of Tunisia women's international footballers

References

External links

1992 births
Living people
Tunisian women's footballers
Women's association football fullbacks
Tunisia women's international footballers
20th-century Tunisian women
21st-century Tunisian women